Turtle Peak is a conspicuous, nearly bare rock summit south of Hedin Nunatak. The peak is joined at its south side to an ice-covered spur which descends southwest from Mount Murphy, on Walgreen Coast, Marie Byrd Land. Mapped by United States Geological Survey (USGS) from surveys and U.S. Navy air photos, 1959–66. Named by Advisory Committee on Antarctic Names (US-ACAN) after John P. Turtle, aurora researcher at Byrd Station in 1962.

Mountains of Marie Byrd Land